Callin' All Dogs is the second album by American rock band Bodeco. Released in 1995, it made a considerable impact on the Louisville music scene, finding a place at #80 on WFPK's "top 1000 best albums ever". Trouser Press asserted that the album reinforced "Bodeco's simple genius by turning up the slop right from the get-go".

Track listing 
Unless otherwise noted, all tracks composed by Bodeco.
 "Crazy Sezy Baby" – 3:32
 "Nut Fuzz" – 2:51
 "Long Way Down" – 2:42
 "High Window" – 3:30
 "Nights Diamond Fingers" – 3:13
 "Bright Lights at the End of the Road" – 3:09
 "Hill and Gully Rider" – 3:10
 "Shaggy's Crawl" – 1:40
 "Signed Confession" – 2:39
 "Lucky 13" – 2:19
 "Chicken Shifter" – 2:21
 "La Cucaracha" (traditional) – 1:49
 "Wicked Mean & Evil" – 2:56
 "Rock & Roll Till the Cows Come Home" – 5:00

Personnel

Performance 
 Jimmy Brown – bass
 Ricky Feather – guitar, vocals
 Matthew "Wink" O'Bannon – guitar
 Gary Stillwell – organ, conga, maracas
 Brian Burkett – trap kit

Production 
 Bodeco – arranger, art direction
 Jeff Carpenter – engineer
 Robbie Cavolina – art direction
 Doug Easley – Engineer
 Howie Gano – Engineer
 Fred Klein – photography
 David McCain – engineer
 Scott Mullins – engineer

References

External links 
 

Bodeco albums
1995 albums